Planaltina is a genus of characins endemic to Brazil.

Species
There are currently 3 recognized species in this genus:
 Planaltina britskii Menezes, S. H. Weitzman & J. R. Burns, 2003
 Planaltina glandipedis Menezes, S. H. Weitzman & J. R. Burns, 2003
 Planaltina myersi J. E. Böhlke, 1954

References

Characidae
Fish of South America
Fish of Brazil
Endemic fauna of Brazil